Chekalin is a surname. Notable people with the surname include:

Alexander Chekalin (born 1947), Russian politician
Alexander Pavlovich Chekalin (1925–1941), Soviet partisan
 (born 1959), Russian composer

Russian-language surnames